I'm with Stupid is a jovial insult, best known as a popular slogan for novelty T-shirts. It may also refer to:

 I'm with Stupid (TV series)
 I'm with Stupid (album), by Aimee Mann
 "I'm with Stupid" (Pet Shop Boys song)
 "I'm with Stupid" (Static-X song)
 I'm with Stupid, a book co-written by Gina Barreca and Gene Weingarten
 "I'm with Stupid" (SpongeBob SquarePants)